The Giolitti I government of Italy held office from 15 May 1892 until 15 December 1893, a total of 579 days, or 1 year and 7 months.

Government parties
The government was composed by the following parties:

Composition

References

Italian governments
1892 establishments in Italy